Bidirectional search is a graph search algorithm that finds a shortest path from an initial vertex to a goal vertex in a directed graph. It runs two simultaneous searches: one forward from the initial state, and one backward from the goal, stopping when the two meet. The reason for this approach is that in many cases it is faster: for instance, in a simplified model of search problem complexity in which both searches expand a tree with branching factor b, and the distance from start to goal is d, each of the two searches has complexity O(bd/2) (in Big O notation), and the sum of these two search times is much less than the O(bd) complexity that would result from a single search from the beginning to the goal.

Andrew Goldberg and others explained the correct termination conditions for the bidirectional version of Dijkstra’s Algorithm.

As in A* search, bi-directional search can be guided by a heuristic estimate of the remaining distance to the goal (in the forward tree) or from the start (in the backward tree).

 was the first one to design and implement a bi-directional heuristic search algorithm. Search trees emanating from the start and goal nodes failed to meet in the middle of the solution space.  The BHFFA algorithm fixed this defect Champeaux (1977).

A solution found by the uni-directional A* algorithm using an admissible heuristic has a shortest path length; the same property holds for the BHFFA2 bidirectional heuristic version described in de Champeaux (1983). BHFFA2 has, among others, more careful termination conditions than BHFFA.

Description 

It returns a valid list of operators that if applied to  will give us .

This has often been likened to a one-way street in the route-finding domain: it is not necessary to be able to travel down both directions, but it is necessary when standing at the end of the street to determine the beginning of the street as a possible route.

Similarly, for those edges that have inverse arcs (i.e. arcs going in both directions) it is not necessary that each direction be of equal cost. The reverse search will always use the inverse cost (i.e. the cost of the arc in the forward direction).

Terminology and notation 

   the branching factor of a search tree
   the cost associated with moving from node  to node 
   the cost from the root to the node  
   the heuristic estimate of the distance between the node  and the goal
   the start state
   the goal state (sometimes , not to be confused with the function)
   the current search direction. By convention,  is equal to 1 for the forward direction and 2 for the backward direction (Kwa 1989)
   the opposite search direction (i.e. )
   the search tree in direction d.
It is from this set that a node is chosen for expansion. In bidirectional search, these are sometimes called the search 'frontiers' or 'wavefronts', referring to how they appear when a search is represented graphically. In this metaphor, a 'collision' occurs when, during the expansion phase, a node from one wavefront is found to have successors in the opposing wavefront.
This set contains the nodes already visited by the search

Approaches for bidirectional heuristic search 

Bidirectional algorithms can be broadly split into three categories: Front-to-Front, Front-to-Back (or Front-to-End), and Perimeter Search (Kaindl Kainz 1997). These differ by the function used to calculate the heuristic.

Front-to-back 

Front-to-Back is the most actively researched of the three categories. The current best algorithm (at least in the Fifteen puzzle domain) is the BiMAX-BS*F algorithm, created by Auer and Kaindl (Auer, Kaindl 2004).

Front-to-front 

The canonical example is that of the BHFFA (Bidirectional Heuristic Front-to-Front Algorithm), where the  function is defined as the minimum of all heuristic estimates between the current node and the nodes on the opposing front. Or, formally:

Front-to-Front suffers from being excessively computationally demanding. Every time a node  is put into the open list, its  value must be calculated.

References

. 
. 
.
.

Graph algorithms
Search algorithms